Łapanów  is a village in Bochnia County, Lesser Poland Voivodeship, in southern Poland. It is the seat of the gmina (administrative district) called Gmina Łapanów.

References

Villages in Bochnia County